Péter Török (18 April 1951 – 20 September 1987) was a Hungarian football defender who played for Hungary in the 1978 FIFA World Cup. He also played for Vasas SC.

References

External links
 FIFA profile

1951 births
1987 deaths
Footballers from Budapest
Hungarian footballers
Hungary international footballers
Association football defenders
Vasas SC players
Volán FC players
Recreativo de Huelva players
Expatriate footballers in Spain
1978 FIFA World Cup players